Don't Move is a horror novel written by James S. Murray and Darren Wearmouth. Published in 2020 by Blackstone Publishing, the story follows a widow named Megan Forrester who embarks on a camping trip with members of a local church. After becoming stranded in a West Virginian forest, they find themselves stalked by a giant prehistoric arachnid that hunts by sensing vibrations.

Development
Author James S. Murray, known for starring in the American television series Impractical Jokers, wrote the novel while self-isolating at his home in Princeton, New Jersey during the COVID-19 pandemic. He co-wrote the book with Darren Wearmouth, who previously collaborated with Murray on the Awakened series.

Reception
A reviewer writing for iHorror concluded that "Murray and Wearmouth succeed at creating a bold page-turner that will keep you on the edge of your seat from the very first chapter to it’s terrifying end."

References

2020 American novels
2020s horror novels
Spiders in popular culture